The 1993–94 Argentine Primera B Nacional was the eight season of second division professional of football in Argentina. A total of 22 teams competed; the champion and runner-up were promoted to Argentine Primera División.

Club information

Standings
Gimnasia y Esgrima (J) was declared champion and was automatically promoted to Primera División, and the teams placed 2nd to 8th qualified for the Second Promotion Playoff.

Second Promotion Playoff
The Second Promotion Playoff or Torneo Reducido was played by the teams placed 2nd to 8th in the overall standings: Quilmes (2nd), San Martín (T) (3rd), Colón (4th), Talleres (C) (5th), Nueva Chicago (6th), Instituto (7th) and Atlético Tucumán (8th), and the champion of Primera B Metropolitana: Chacarita Juniors. The winning team was promoted to Primera División.

Bracket

Note: The team in the first line plays at home the second leg.

Relegation

Note: Clubs with indirect affiliation with AFA are relegated to their respective league of his province according to the Argentine football league system, while clubs directly affiliated face relegation to Primera B Metropolitana. Clubs with direct affiliation are all from Greater Buenos Aires, with the exception of Newell's, Rosario Central, Central Córdoba and Argentino de Rosario, all from Rosario, and Unión and Colón from Santa Fe.

See also
1993–94 in Argentine football

References

External links

Primera B Nacional seasons
2
1993 in South American football leagues
1994 in South American football leagues